Custodio Dos Reis (30 November 1922 in Rabat, Morocco – 26 November 1959) was a French professional road bicycle racer. Born with Portuguese nationality, Dos Reis became French citizen in 1931. In 1950, Dos Reis won the 14th stage of the 1950 Tour de France.

Major results
1950
Tour de France:
Winner stage 14

External links 

Official Tour de France results for Custodio Dos Reis

French male cyclists
1922 births
1959 deaths
French Tour de France stage winners
Sportspeople from Rabat

French people of Portuguese descent